Mandy Lui Man-tik (born 1 June 1994 in Hong Kong) is a Hong Kong former Hong Kong professional footballer who currently plays for Hong Kong First Division club Happy Valley.

Club career
As an aspiring footballer, Lui attended Yan Chai Hospital Tung Chi Ying Memorial Secondary School due to their strong football teams. He trained as a member of Kitchee's academy and was signed in 2013 but never featured for the first team. Lui went on loan to Sun Hei during his year at Kitchee.

Following his release from Kitchee in 2014, he played for North District.

In the summer of 2017, Lui was recruited by Dreams FC head coach Leung Chi Wing to play for his side. He scored his first goal for the club on 5 November in a 2-1 loss to R&F.

On 16 July 2019, Lui signed for Pegasus.

References

External links

Lui Man Tik at HKFA

1994 births
Living people
Hong Kong footballers
Association football defenders
Hong Kong Premier League players
Kitchee SC players
Sun Hei SC players
Dreams Sports Club players
TSW Pegasus FC players
Happy Valley AA players